Gianluca Mager was the defending champion but chose not to defend his title.

Tomáš Macháč won the title after defeating Botic van de Zandschulp 6–3, 4–6, 6–3 in the final.

Seeds
All seeds receive a bye into the second round.

Draw

Finals

Top half

Section 1

Section 2

Bottom half

Section 3

Section 4

References

External links
Main draw
Qualifying draw

2020 ATP Challenger Tour
2020 Singles